Eastern Sounds is an album by jazz saxophonist and multi-instrumentalist Yusef Lateef, recorded in 1961. The album features Lateef's continued exploration of Middle Eastern music, which were incorporated into his version of hard bop with a quartet featuring Barry Harris on piano. The opening track features Lateef on Chinese globular flute, generally called xun. The fusing of musical genres was not a new thing in jazz or for Lateef as his 1957 album Prayer to the East incorporated the shehnai and Middle Eastern influences in playing jazz standards. Aside from Lateef's original compositions, there are covers of themes from the films Spartacus and The Robe, the last one being used as samples by Blockhead and Nujabes.

Track listing
"The Plum Blossom" (Yusef Lateef) – 5:03
"Blues for the Orient" (Lateef) – 5:40
"Chinq Miau" (Lateef) – 3:20
"Don't Blame Me" (Jimmy McHugh) – 4:57
"Love Theme from Spartacus" (Alex North) – 4:15
"Snafu" (Lateef) – 5:42
"Purple Flower" (Lateef) – 4:32
"Love Theme from The Robe" (Alfred Newman) – 4:02
"The Three Faces of Balal" (Lateef) – 2:23

Trivia
Singer-songwriter Cat Stevens was inspired by the melody of the opening track to write his first hit single "I Love My Dog" (1966). Lateef later received credits and royalties for it.

Personnel
Yusef Lateef – flute, oboe, tenor saxophone, xun (called "Chinese globular flute" in liner notes)
Barry Harris – piano
Ernie Farrow – double bass, Rabaab (called "rabat" in liner notes)
Lex Humphries – drums

References

1962 albums
Yusef Lateef albums
Moodsville Records albums
Hard bop albums
Jazz fusion albums by American artists
Albums produced by Esmond Edwards
Albums recorded at Van Gelder Studio